Square Pharmaceuticals Ltd. is a Bangladeshi multinational pharmaceutical company. It was founded in 1958 by Samson H. Chowdhury along with three of his friends PK Saha, Kazi Harunur Roshid and Radhabinod Rai as a private firm. It went public in 1991 and is listed on the Dhaka Stock Exchange and on the Chittagong Stock Exchange (ID of SPL: 13002) Square Pharmaceutical started to export different antibiotics and medicine across the world from 1987. Now it exports its medicine to 36 countries of the world.

In 2008 and 2009 it had the highest market share in the pharmaceutical industry of Bangladesh. For the last couple of years, it has been seeing double digit revenue every year. the Forbes list said Square Pharmaceutical Company of Bangladesh, involved in drug and chemical business, has sales volume worth $512 million. The local pharma's market capital is $1.7 billion. Its net income is $150 million and has employed 9,240 people.

References

External links
 Company website

Companies based in Dhaka
Pharmaceutical companies of Bangladesh
Pharmaceutical companies established in 1958
Bangladeshi brands
Vaccine producers
1958 establishments in East Pakistan
Square Group